Minhang District is a suburban district of Shanghai with a land area of  and population of 2,429,000 residents as of 2010. The original Minhang consist of present-day Jiangchuan Road Subdistrict (Former Minhang Town) and the eastern strip of Wujing along the Huangpu River in 1992, the surrounding Shanghai County merged with Minhang.

It is mostly a residential district, though it is also home to some of the many factories and production facilities in Shanghai. Residential housing development is the main source of local government revenue. Qizhong Forest Sports City Arena (旗忠森林体育城) is located in Ma Qiao Town (马桥镇). The Aerospace Museum is being constructed at Pujiang Town.

Shanghai Jiao Tong University and East China Normal University both have campuses in the southern part of Minhang District.

Administrative divisions
Minhang administers 4 subdistricts and 9 towns.

Of particular note is Qibao (七宝), a tourist attraction in the northern part of the district, and Maqiao, which hosted the Shanghai ATP Masters tennis tournament and is the site of the Neolithic Ruins of Maqiao. The town of Hongqiao also overlaps with Hongqiao Subdistrict in Changning District, and is next to the location of Shanghai Hongqiao International Airport, the city's older commercial airport and which is used primarily for domestic flights.

Economy
The hotel chain Huazhu Hotels Group is headquartered in Minhang District. The fast food chain Yonghe King has its headquarters in Minhang District. Want Want China, the milk manufacturer, has its headquarters in the district.

Education
International schools include:

 British International School Puxi Campus
 Nord Anglia Chinese International School
 Shanghai American School Puxi Campus
 Shanghai Japanese School Hongqiao Campus (elementary school)
 Shanghai Korean School
 Shanghai Singapore International School Minhang Campus
 Dulwich College Shanghai Puxi Campus

Closed:
 Shanghai Rego International School

Transportation
 Public bicycle share scheme, with more than 20,000 bikes available for free use, after a registration process.
Luheng Road Comprehensive Passenger Transport Hub Project Luheng Road Comprehensive Passenger Transport Hub, located at Puxing Road NO. 569 Minhang District, is taking up a land of 27,612 square meters and connected to Metro Line 8 at Luheng Road Stop. It is one of the two Park and Ride testing Transportation Hubs in Shanghai, boasting departure and terminal stops of 6 bus lines connecting to downtown Shanghai and 500 parking spaces. Commuters can save the expensive parking fee in the downtown area and park their cars here and transfer to the Metro or bus lines for work. The project was started in 2011 and the hub has been put into use in 2016.

Metro
Minhang is currently served by six metro lines operated by Shanghai Metro:
 - Xinzhuang Station , Waihuanlu, Lianhua Road
 - Hongqiao Railway Station , Hongqiao Airport Terminal 2 
 - Xinzhuang Station , Chunshen Road, Yindu Road, Zhuanqiao, Beiqiao, Jianchuan Road, Dongchuan Road, Jinping Road, Huaning Road, Wenjing Road, Minhang Development Zone
 - Luheng Road, Pujiang Town, Jiangyue Road, Lianhang Road, Shendu Highway
 - Zhongchun Road, Qibao, Xingzhong Road, Hechuan Road
 - Hangzhong Road, Ziteng Road, Longbai Xincun / Hongqiao Railway Station , Hongqiao Airport Terminal 2  (Hongqiao Airport Terminal 1 is in Changning District)
Line 17

Gallery

Climate 

Minhang has a humid continental climate (Köppen climate classification Dwa).

References

Further reading

External links 

 Minhang District Government Website
 Minhang District Government Website 
 Shanghai Daily's Minhang Information Website

 
Districts of Shanghai